The 12929 / 12930 Valsad–Vadodara Intercity Superfast Express is a Superfast Express train of the Indian Railways connecting  and  of Gujarat. It is currently being operated with 12929/12930 train numbers on a daily basis.

Currently, it is running upto .

Coach composition

The train has standard rakes with max speed of 110 kmph. The train consists of 22 coaches:

 2 Luggage cum Brake vans
 2 AC Chair Car
 10 Second Seating
 8 General Unreserved

Service

12929/Valsad–Vadodara Intercity Superfast Express has an average speed of 60 km/hr and covers 199 km in 3 hrs 20 mins.
12930/Vadodara–Valsad Intercity Superfast Express has an average speed of 55 km/hr and covers 199 km in 3 hrs 35 mins.

Route & halts

The important halts of the train are:

Schedule

Traction

Both trains are hauled by a Vadodara Loco Shed based WAP-5 / WAP-7 locomotive from end to end.

External links 

 12929/Valsad - Vadodara Intercity Superfast Express India Rail Info
 12930/Vadodara - Valsad Intercity Superfast Express India Rail Info

References 

Transport in Valsad
Transport in Vadodara
Rail transport in Gujarat
Intercity Express (Indian Railways) trains
Railway services introduced in 1992